Whiteout is an album by alternative rock band Boss Hog.

Music
While previous Boss Hog albums were indelibly stamped with the guitar-heavy aesthetic of Jon Spencer, AllMusic critic Chris Handyside describes Whiteout as fully planned and led by Cristina Martinez. The results are a modernized version of the group's signature sound, "garage punk and new wave girl groups as refracted through a 21st century looking glass." SPIN called it "ingeniously slicked-up garage pop."

Track listing
All songs written by Boss Hog.

Personnel
Musicians
 Cristina Martinez – lead vocals
 Jon Spencer – guitar, backing vocals
 Jens Jurgensen – bass
 Hollis Queens – drums, backing vocals
 Mark Boyce – keyboard

Production
 Staffan Olofsson – mastering on Tracks 1, 2 and 6-8
 Roger Jonsson – mastering on Tracks 3-5, 9 and 10 at CD-Plant Mastering, Malmö, Sweden
 Tore Johansson – mixing on Tracks 1-4 and "Get It While You Wait" at Tambourine Studios
 Bil Emmons – engineering
 Reto Peter – assistant engineer on Tracks 1-4
 Jim Sclavunos – mixing on "Fear for You"
 Eric Tew & Phil Painson – assistant engineers on "Fear for You" and "Jaguar"
 Eric Tew – assistant engineer on "Get It While You Wait" and "Itchy & Scratchy"
 JG Thirlwell – mixing on "Jaguar"
 Roli Mosimann – mixing on "Itchy & Scratchy" at East Side Sounds
 Juan Garcia – assistant engineer on "Trouble" and "Monkey"
 Cris Moor – photography
 Laura Genninger – art direction
 STUDIO 191 – design

References

External links
 

2000 albums
Boss Hog albums
In the Red Records albums